Eero Korte (born 20 September 1987) is a Finnish former professional footballer who played as a midfielder.

Early in his career, Korte was called "the next Jari Litmanen" by Finnish football experts due to his phenomenal technique, but failed to live up to expectations. Although Korte made his Veikkausliiga debut already in 2004, only at the age of 16, he suffered from multiple injuries during the first years at Lahti. During the years 2003–2004 he was invited to various training camps of clubs like Ajax, Chelsea and Fiorentina.

The 2008 season is widely believed to be the year of his breakthrough in the Premier Division. During the next season he played in all FC Lahti's matches, as they placed third in Veikkausliiga.

But soon after the 2010 season as FC Lahti were relegated from Veikkausliiga, Korte joined JJK on a two-year contract.

After spending two years in JJK he returned to Lahti for one season before joining in newly promoted Ilves on a two-year contract.

References

Guardian Football
Veikkausliiga Hall of Fame

External links
Korte's profile on Veikkausliiga's website

Living people
1987 births
People from Orimattila
Association football midfielders
Finnish footballers
Finland youth international footballers
FC Lahti players
JJK Jyväskylä players
FC Ilves players
Veikkausliiga players
Sportspeople from Päijät-Häme